Paulo Robspierry Carreiro (born 16 January 1983), commonly known as Paulinho or Paulinho Piracicaba, is a Brazilian-born Hong Kong professional footballer who currently plays for Hong Kong Premier League club HKFC.

Club career

Shenzhen 
On 31 December 2015, Paulinho transferred to China League One side Shenzhen for a 7 unit fee and commanded a 2 year deal. However due to his recurring injury issues at the club, Paulinho would sit out for most of the season and would make his debut in the league against Qingdao Jonoon until he was subbed off in the 74th minute. Due to his injuries issues again, he would be sent to the Netherlands for surgery twice and making 4 appearances for Shenzhen as a total.

Kitchee 
On 12 July 2017, Kitchee announced that Paulinho would return to the club. Paulinho would make his 2nd debut for the club against Yuen Long as a substitute coming in to replace Lam Zhi Gin in the 63rd minute and helping Kitchee gain a 3-0 victory. He would score his first goal in his return against Rangers, scoring a header 91 minutes in to assist Kitchee in 1 7-0 victory.

R&F 
On 7 August 2018, Paulinho left Kitchee after one season to sign with R&F. He was released at the end of his contract on 19 June 2019.

HKFC 

In October 2022, Paulinho returned to top-flight and joined HKFC.

On November 6th, Paulinho made his debut for HKFC in the Hong Kong Sapling Cup and scored twice to finish off his debut against Tai Po FC.

International career
Paulinho was born and raised in Brazil, but became a naturalized Hong Kong citizen. Paulinho acquired his HKSAR passport on 31 October 2015, making him eligible to represent Hong Kong on the international level.

Paulinho made his international debut for Hong Kong in a friendly against Myanmar on 7 November 2015 and scored his first goal against Maldives in 2018 FIFA World Cup qualification – AFC Second Round on 12 November 2015.

Career statistics

International goals
Scores and results list Hong Kong's goal tally first.

Honours

Club
Citizen
Hong Kong Senior Shield: 2010–11;Kitchee
Hong Kong Premier League: 2014–15, 2017–18
Hong Kong FA Cup: 2017–18
Hong Kong Sapling Cup: 2017–18
Hong Kong League Cup: 2014–15

Individual
Hong Kong Senior Shield: Top scorer 2010–11

References

External links

Paulinho at HKFA

1983 births
Hong Kong footballers
Hong Kong international footballers
Hong Kong expatriate footballers
Hong Kong people of Brazilian descent
Brazilian footballers
Association football forwards
Brazilian expatriate footballers
Brazilian emigrants to Hong Kong
Brazilian expatriate sportspeople in China
Hong Kong expatriate sportspeople in China
Citizen AA players
Shenzhen F.C. players
Kitchee SC players
R&F (Hong Kong) players
Hong Kong FC players
Expatriate footballers in China
Expatriate footballers in Hong Kong
Hong Kong Premier League players
China League One players
Living people
Naturalized footballers of Hong Kong
Hong Kong League XI representative players
People from Piracicaba
Footballers from São Paulo (state)